The Highway 17 Express is an Amtrak Thruway route provided by a consortium of entities that provides regional service between San Jose and Santa Cruz County in the South Bay of the San Francisco Bay Area. The service is so called because it travels on California State Route 17. It is operated by the Santa Cruz Metropolitan Transit District.

History

A temporary commuter express bus service started after landslides from the 1989 Loma Prieta earthquake closed Highway 17. At this time the route spanned from Scotts Valley to Santa Clara. In response to the needs of a loyal group of riders, as well as UC Santa Cruz students, Santa Cruz Metro continued the service after Highway 17 reopened. 

When service was consolidated with Amtrak Thruway in 2004, the route was extended to the metro center in downtown Santa Cruz and service expanded to 365 days a year. Caltrans anticipated a ridership of 7,000 riders per month at the end of 2004. In December 2007, free wifi service was added to all Highway 17 Express buses. In February 2015, Santa Cruz Metro reported 31,102 total riders, 1,239 on the average weekday, for Highway 17 Express.

Service

The bus service is a consolidation of corridor-based commuter service between Santa Cruz and job centers in the Silicon Valley. It passes through the State Route 17 communities of the Santa Cruz Mountains including Scotts Valley, Redwood Estates, Summit, and Pasatiempo and is combined with feeder and delivery service for several Amtrak California lines serving Diridon Station in San Jose, a regional intermodal hub where passengers may transfer to VTA buses or light rail in addition to ACE, Capitol Corridor, Caltrain, and also many regional Amtrak routes. During the week the service extends beyond Diridon Station with direct service to downtown San Jose; on weekends it terminates at the station.

One-way fare is $7.00, with half-price fare available for seniors and disabled riders. A day pass that is also good for all VTA bus and light rail as well as Santa Cruz Metro buses is available for $14.00. The VTA EcoPass Express is good for travel on the Highway 17 Express service. Support for purchasing tickets using the Clipper card is not currently supported.

Most buses are equipped with bike racks capable of holding three bicycles. Currently, up to two bicycles are allowed inside the bus in the area used to secure disabled passengers contained within mobility devices, at the coach operator's discretion, if space is available.

References

External links

Santa Cruz Metro website

Bus transportation in California
Public transportation in Santa Cruz County, California
Public transportation in Santa Clara County, California